I Can See Your Voice Cambodia is a Cambodian television mystery music game show series based on the South Korean programme of the same name. Since its premiere on 10 February 2019, it has aired three seasons on Hang Meas HDTV.

Gameplay

Format
Presented with a group of seven "mystery singers" identified only by their occupation, a guest artist must attempt to eliminate bad singers from the group without ever hearing them sing, assisted by clues and a celebrity panel over the course of four rounds. At the end of the game, the last remaining mystery singer is revealed as either good or bad by means of a duet between them and one of the guest artists.

Rewards
If the singer is good, he/she will perform again in the post-season encore concert episode; if the singer is bad, he/she wins 1,000,000៛.

Rounds
Each episode presents the guest artist with seven people whose identities and singing voices are kept concealed until they are eliminated to perform on the "stage of truth" or remain in the end to perform the final duet.

Series overview

References

International versions of I Can See Your Voice
2010s Cambodian television series
2019 Cambodian television series debuts
Hang Meas HDTV original programming